Linton-Stockton High School is located in Linton, Indiana in Greene County.

About
The enrollment is more than three hundred.

Athletics
The mascot for this school is the Miner, and the school colors are red and blue. Linton-Stockton High School is currently a member of the Southwestern Indiana Athletic Conference. The Linton-Stockton Football has won 14 sectional championships, 10 regionals, two semi-states and one state title in 2016 — all in Class A through the 2020–21 school year.

Notable alumni
 Dorothy Mengering – television personality, author and late mother of humorist David Letterman

See also
 List of high schools in Indiana

References

External links
 School website

Public high schools in Indiana
Former Southern Indiana Athletic Conference members
Schools in Greene County, Indiana